Sir Norman Joseph Wisdom,  (4 February 1915 – 4 October 2010) was an English actor, comedian, musician and singer best known for a series of comedy films produced between 1953 and 1966 featuring a hapless onscreen character often called Norman Pitkin. He was awarded the 1953 BAFTA Award for Most Promising Newcomer to Leading Film Roles following the release of Trouble in Store, his first film in a lead role.

Wisdom gained celebrity status in lands as far apart as South America, Iran and many Eastern Bloc countries, particularly in Albania where his films were the only ones with Western actors permitted to be shown by dictator Enver Hoxha. Charlie Chaplin once referred to Wisdom as his "favourite clown".

Wisdom later forged a career on Broadway in New York City and as a television actor, winning critical acclaim for his dramatic role of a dying cancer patient in the television play Going Gently in 1981. He toured Australia and South Africa. After the 1986 Chernobyl disaster, a hospice was named in his honour. In 1995, he was given the Freedom of the City of London and of Tirana. The same year, he was appointed OBE and was knighted five years later.

Early life 
Norman Joseph Wisdom was born in the Marylebone district of London. His parents were Frederick, a chauffeur, and Maud Wisdom (née Targett), a dressmaker who often worked for West End theatres, and had made a dress for Queen Mary. The couple married in Marylebone on 15 July 1912. Wisdom had an elder brother, Frederick Thomas "Fred" Wisdom (13 December 1912 – 1 July 1971).

The family lived at 91 Fernhead Road, Maida Vale, London W9, where they slept in one room. He and his brother were brought up in extreme poverty and were frequently hit by their father who would pick them up and throw them across the room.

After a period in a children's home in Deal, Kent, Wisdom ran away when he was 11 but returned to become an errand boy in a grocer's shop on leaving school at 13. Having been kicked out of his home by his father he became homeless and slept rough in London, in 1929 he walked (by his own account) to Cardiff, Wales, where he became a cabin boy in the Merchant Navy. He later also worked as a waiter and page in hotels where room and board was supplied for the staff.

Military service 
Wisdom first enlisted into the King's Own Royal Regiment (Lancaster), but his mother had him discharged as he was under age. He later re-enlisted as a drummer boy in the 10th Royal Hussars. In 1930, he was posted to Lucknow, in the United Provinces of British India, as a bandsman. 

He rode horses, became the flyweight boxing champion of the British Army in India and taught himself to play the piano, trumpet, saxophone, flute, drums, bugle and clarinet.

At the outbreak of the Second World War, Wisdom was sent to work in a communications centre in a command bunker in London, where he connected telephone calls from war leaders to the prime minister. He met Winston Churchill on several occasions when asked for updates on incoming calls. Wisdom then joined the Royal Corps of Signals, and performed a similar military function at the unit headquarters in Cheltenham, Gloucestershire.

Whilst performing a shadow boxing routine in an army gym, Wisdom discovered he had a talent for entertainment, and began to develop his skills as a musician and stage entertainer. In 1940 aged 25, at a NAAFI entertainment night, during a dance routine, Wisdom stepped down from his position in the orchestra pit, and started shadow boxing. Hearing his colleagues and officers giggling, he broke into a duck waddle, followed by a series of facial expressions. He later described the reaction as: "They were in hysterics. All the officers were falling about laughing."

Wisdom later said this was where he first patented his persona as "The Successful Failure". Over the next few years, until he was demobilised in 1945, his routine included his characteristic singing and the trip-up-and-stumble. After Wisdom appeared at a charity concert at Cheltenham Town Hall on 31 August 1944, actor Rex Harrison came backstage and urged him to become a professional entertainer.

Comic entertainer 
After being demobilised Wisdom worked as a private hire car driver. Having improved his diction in the army, he also took a job as a night telephone operator.

Wisdom made his debut as a professional entertainer at the age of 31 still calling himself "The Successful Failure". In the anonymity of small suburban music halls he built an act out of his shyness, his ability to fall and his multi-instrumental music skills and singing talent where the theatre band constantly changed key and he could never keep up until pulling out his virtuosity and beating them at their own game. One outstanding review in August 1946 read, "An unusual and most versatile comedian, Norman Wisdom, contributes two remarkable turns. He is an accomplished pianist, a pleasing singer, a talented instrumentalist, a clever mimer, and withal, a true humorist.". His rise to the top was relatively fast. A very successful run at the London Casino in April 1948, led to a summer season in "Out of the Blue" in Scarborough. Magician David Nixon was also part of the cast and the two worked together so well that they went on to continue the act on other variety stages starting at the London Casino in September 1948. Christmas 1948 saw him in the pantomime "Robinson Crusoe" at Birmingham's Alexandra Theatre. Wisdom had already adopted the costume that would remain his trademark: tweed flat cap askew, with peak turned up; a suit at least two sizes too tight; a crumpled collar and a mangled tie. The character that went with this costume — known as the Gump — was to dominate Wisdom's film career. A West End theatre star within two years, he honed his act into a star turn mainly between theatres in London and Brighton:

Wisdom made his TV debut in 1948 and was soon commanding enormous audiences and had a small film role in A Date with a Dream released in the same year.

Starring film roles for the Rank Organisation 
Wisdom made a series of low-budget star-vehicle comedies for the Rank Organisation, beginning with Trouble in Store (1953). This film earned him a BAFTA Award for Most Promising Newcomer to Film in 1954. It was the second most popular film at the British box-office in 1954 and exhibitors voted him the tenth biggest star at the British box office the same year.

His films' cheerful, unpretentious appeal make them the direct descendants of those made a generation earlier by George Formby. Never highly thought of by the critics, they were very popular with domestic audiences and Wisdom's films were among Britain's biggest box-office successes of their day. They were also successful in some unlikely overseas markets, helping Rank stay afloat financially when their more expensive film projects were unsuccessful.

The films usually involved the Gump character, usually called Norman, in a manual occupation in which he is barely competent and in a junior position to a straight man, often played by Edward Chapman (as Mr Grimsdale) or Jerry Desmonde. They benefited from Wisdom's capacity for physical slapstick comedy and his skill at creating a sense of the character's helplessness. The series often contained a romantic subplot; the Gump's inevitable awkwardness with women is a characteristic shared with the earlier Formby vehicles. His innocent incompetence still made him endearing to the heroine.

Wisdom's second film as star, One Good Turn (1955), was the seventh most popular movie of 1955 in Britain. He made a cameo in As Long as They're Happy (1955), then returned in Man of the Moment (1955). He was the 6th most popular star of 1955.

Wisdom was a window cleaner in Up in the World (1956) and worked in a jewellery store in Just My Luck (1957). The box office receipts of these last few films had declined from previous Wisdom films but The Square Peg (1959), an army comedy, reversed the trend and was one of the year's biggest hits. The film was the 7th most popular movie at the British box office in 1959. Less successful was Follow a Star (1959). There Was a Crooked Man (1960) was an attempt to change Wisdom's image away from Rank Organisation. The Bulldog Breed (1960) was more conventional. The film also starred a young Michael Caine who later recalled he did not enjoy working with Wisdom because he "wasn't very nice to support-part actors". Wisdom remained the 10th biggest star at the British box office.

Wisdom was in The Girl on the Boat (1961) from a novel by P. G. Wodehouse, a second film away from the Rank formula. On the Beat (1962) as a car cleaner and A Stitch in Time (1963), in which he was cast as an apprentice butcher, returned him to the regular format.

The Early Bird (1965), his first colour film, had Wisdom as a milkman. After a cameo in The Sandwich Man (1966), Wisdom starred in Press for Time (1966), the last film in this sequence of starring vehicles. Wisdom was still voted the 5th most popular star at the British box office.

Whilst Wisdom's stage performances often involved musical numbers, he wrote only a few of them. He has seven songs attributed to him in the ASCAP database, which are: "Beware", "Don't Laugh at Me ('cause I'm a Fool)", "Falling in Love", "Follow a Star", "I Love You", "Please Opportunity", and "Up in the World".

Later career 

In 1966, Wisdom spent a short period in the United States to star in the Broadway production of the Jimmy Van Heusen and Sammy Cahn musical comedy Walking Happy based on the play Hobson's Choice by Harold Brighouse. His performance as Will Mosop was nominated for a Tony Award.

This led to Wisdom's being cast in his first Hollywood film, The Night They Raided Minsky's (1968) and in the US Television musical of George Bernard Shaw's Androcles and The Lion (1967) with songs by Richard Rogers and co-starring Noël Coward.

After a typical performance on The Ed Sullivan Show, further US opportunities were denied him when he had to return to London after his second wife left him. His subsequent career was largely confined to television, and he toured the world with a successful cabaret act. He won critical acclaim in 1981 for his dramatic role of a dying cancer patient in the television play Going Gently.

Wisdom was one of several actors initially considered for the role of Frank Spencer in Some Mothers Do 'Ave 'Em. However, he turned the role down and it eventually went to Michael Crawford. The creator of the series Raymond Allen later stated "Norman Wisdom was offered the role but turned it down because he didn't find it funny".

On 31 December 1976, Wisdom performed his theme song "Don't Laugh at Me ('cause I'm a Fool)" on BBC1's A Jubilee of Music, celebrating British pop music for Queen Elizabeth II's impending Silver Jubilee. Wisdom had performed in front of the Queen at many Royal Command Performances, the first being in 1952.

After touring South Africa, Zimbabwe and Australia with some success, his appearances in Britain became more infrequent. He spent much of the 1980s in seclusion on the Isle of Man.

Wisdom's career revived in the 1990s, helped by the young comedian Lee Evans, whose act was often compared to Wisdom's work. The high point of this new popularity was the knighthood he was awarded, for services to entertainment, in the 2000 New Year's honours list. During the ceremony, once he had received his knighthood, he walked away and again performed his trademark trip, at which the Queen smiled and laughed.

From 1995 until 2004 he appeared in the recurring role of Billy Ingleton in the long-running BBC comedy Last of the Summer Wine.

In 1996, he received a Special Achievement Award from the London Film Critics.

Wisdom was a guest on a This Is Your Life special in 2000 for actor and director Todd Carty. He appeared as a half-time guest at the England vs Albania 2002 World Cup qualifier at St James' Park, Newcastle upon Tyne, and scored a penalty at the Leazes End.

In 2002 Wisdom filmed a cameo role as a butler in a low-budget horror film. In 2004, he made an appearance on Coronation Street, playing fitness fanatic pensioner Ernie Crabbe. In 2007 he came out of retirement to take a role in a short film called Expresso.

Popularity in Albania 
Wisdom was a well-known performer in Albania, where he was one of the few Western actors whose films were allowed in the country under Enver Hoxha. According to Hoxha's dialectical materialist viewpoint, proletarian Norman's ultimately victorious struggles against capitalism, personified by Mr Grimsdale and the effete aristocratic characters played by Jerry Desmonde, were a Communist parable on the class war. He was known as Mr Pitkin after the character from his films. In 1995, he visited the post-Stalinist country where, to his surprise, he was greeted by many appreciative fans, including the then President, Sali Berisha. During this trip, Wisdom was filmed by Newsnight as he visited a children's project funded by ChildHope UK.

On a visit in 2001, which coincided with the England football team playing Albania in the city of Tirana, his appearance at the training ground overshadowed that of David Beckham. He appeared on the pitch before the start of the Albania v England match wearing a half-Albanian and half-English football shirt. He was well received by the crowd, especially when he performed one of his trademark trips on his way out to the centre circle. In 1995 Wisdom was made an honorary citizen of Tirana.

In his book and TV series One Hit Wonderland, Tony Hawks united with Wisdom and, along with Tim Rice, released a single, "Big in Albania", in an attempt to enter the Albanian pop charts. It reached number 18 on the Top Albania Radio chart.

Retirement 

In October 2004, Wisdom announced he would retire from the entertainment industry on his 90th birthday (4 February 2005). He announced that he intended to spend more time with his family, playing golf and driving around the Isle of Man, where he was living.

In 2007, Wisdom returned to acting in a short film directed by Kevin Powis, Expresso. The film, which Wisdom later announced (reported BBC/ITV News) was to be officially his last film role, is set during one day in a coffee shop and was funded by the UK Film Council and ScreenWM. Shot in January, it premièred at the Cannes Film Festival on 27 May 2007. It was later adopted by the UK charity Macmillan and released on DVD in aid of the charity.

In the film, Wisdom plays a vicar plagued by a fly in a café. Producer Nigel Martin Davey gave him only a visual role so that he would not have to remember any lines, but on the day, Wisdom was alert and had his performance changed to add more laughs.

Personal life 
Wisdom was married twice. His first wife was Doreen Brett, whom he married in 1941. By 1944 they had separated when Doreen gave birth to a son, Michael (born 1944), fathered by Albert Gerald Hardwick, a telephone engineer. The marriage was dissolved in 1946.

He married his second wife, Freda Isobel Simpson, in 1947; they had two children: Nicholas (born 1953, who later played first-class cricket for Sussex) and Jacqueline (born 1954). The couple divorced in 1969, with Wisdom granted full custody of the children. Freda Wisdom died in Brighton in 1992.

Popular in the Isle of Man, he lived for 27 years in a house in Andreas named Ballalough (Manx for "lake farm", also a humorous corruption of the English "belly laugh"). He supported various charities and charitable works, including orphanages in Albania. In 2005, Wisdom starred in a video for the Manx girl group Twisted Angels, for their single "LA", in support of the local charity Project 21.

During the 1960s, he was involved in a famous legal case (Wisdom v Chamberlain, 1968) in which he was pursued by the Inland Revenue for tax on profits made from the sale of silver bullion he had bought when concerned about the further devaluation of sterling. He contended that it was an investment, but the court held that it had been a trading venture and was duly chargeable to income tax.

Interests 

Wisdom was a lifelong supporter and a former board member of football team Brighton & Hove Albion. He also liked Everton and Newcastle United. He enjoyed golf, and was a member of the Grand Order of Water Rats. He was an honorary member of the Winkle Club, a charity in Hastings, East Sussex.

A lover of cars, his collection included a 1956 Bentley S1 Continental R Type fastback, which he first bought in 1961, and then again in the late 1980s. In 1969, he purchased, after the divorce from Freda Simpson, a Shelby Cobra 427, CSX3206, in New York, which he kept until 1986, when it was sold to another car enthusiast in Brighton, UK. Until his age and declining mental health meant he failed a Department of Transport fitness-to-drive test, he owned and drove a 1987 Rolls-Royce Silver Spirit and a Jaguar S-Type, which were sold in September 2005.

In 1963, he bought a new motor yacht. After three years of extensive works and sea trials, she was named M/Y Conquest and valued at £1.25 million by insurers. It was available for charter at £6,000 a month but Wisdom later sold it, saying that he was "no sailor".

Allegations of inappropriate behaviour 
Actress Fenella Fielding, who worked with Wisdom on his 1959 film Follow a Star, said he was "not a very pleasant man. Always making a pass – hand up your skirt first thing in the morning. Not exactly a lovely way to start a day's filming." Lynda Bellingham, who worked with Wisdom on A Little Bit of Wisdom, recalled a comedy sketch where "for ten minutes I stood there while he basically touched me up and you couldn't say anything because he was the master of comedy." Singer Tina Charles, who had a number one with "I Love To Love" in 1976, alleged that Wisdom molested her in his dressing room when she was 16.

Health decline 
In mid-2006, after he suffered an irregular heart rhythm, Wisdom was flown by helicopter to hospital in Liverpool and was fitted with a heart pacemaker.

Wisdom resided in the Abbotswood nursing home in Ballasalla, where he had been resident from 12 July 2007.

On the release of Expresso to DVD in the same month, BBC News confirmed that Wisdom lived in a care home, because of his suffering from vascular dementia. It was also reported that he had granted his children power of attorney over his affairs and, having sold off his flat in Epsom, Surrey, they were now in the process of selling his Isle of Man home to raise money to fund his longer-term care.

On 16 January 2008, BBC2 aired Wonderland: The Secret Life Of Norman Wisdom Aged 92 and 3/4. The documentary highlighted the dilemma of coping with an ageing parent. His family said that Wisdom's memory loss had become so severe that he no longer recognised himself in his films.

Death 
In the six months prior to his death, Wisdom suffered a series of strokes, causing a decline in his physical and mental health.  He died on 4 October 2010 at Abbotswood nursing home on the Isle of Man at the age of 95.

His funeral took place on 22 October 2010 in Douglas, Isle of Man, and all of the island were invited.  His trademark cloth cap was placed on the coffin in the church.  The funeral was attended by a large number of showbusiness personalities and, at Wisdom's request, Moira Anderson sang "Who Can I Turn To", which was specially arranged for the occasion by Gordon Cree. Wisdom's body was buried at Kirk Bride Churchyard, Bride, Isle of Man.

Tributes and other references 

In 2007, a Norman Wisdom-themed bar opened at the Sefton Hotel, Douglas, called Sir Norman's. It has stills from his many films on the walls and TV screens playing some clips of his old films. The bronze statue of Wisdom, which used to be on a bench outside Douglas Town Hall, has been moved to the steps leading into the hotel bar on Harris Promenade.
Wisdom featured on the BBC Radio 4 series Desert Island Discs in August 2000. Of the eight songs he chose, four were performed by Wisdom himself (including his favourite, 'Don't Laugh at Me 'Cos I'm a Fool'), while a fifth was a duet with Joyce Grenfell.
The 2011 film My Week with Marilyn features impersonator Glenn Michael Ford playing Norman Wisdom in a background scene.
A Wetherspoon pub in Deal, Kent, where Wisdom ran away from the children's home, was named The Sir Norman Wisdom in his honour when it opened in March 2013.
In 2015 Wisdom of a Fool, a new one-man play based on the life of Norman Wisdom opened at The Capitol Theatre, Horsham, in Wisdom's centenary year, on 17 September. A UK tour began at Guildford's Yvonne Arnaud Theatre in 2016 and continues into 2018.
Wisdom is mentioned in the song The Things That Dreams Are Made Of by the Human League.

Filmography

Box office ranking 
For a number of years British exhibitors voted Wisdom one of the most popular stars in the country.
1954 – 10th most popular star (3rd most popular British star)
1955 – 6th most popular star (3rd most popular British star)
1956 – 5th biggest British star
1957 – 9th most popular star (5th most popular British star)
1958 – 7th most popular British star
1959 – 3rd most popular British star
1963 – 10th most popular star
1966 – 5th most popular star

Audio recordings 

 I Would Like to Put on Record
 Jingle Jangle
 The Very Best of Norman Wisdom
 Androcles and the Lion US Television, Original Cast Recording.
 Where's Charley? London Cast Recording.
 Wisdom of a Fool
 Nobody's Fool
 Follow a Star
 1957 Original Chart Hits
 Walking Happy Original Broadway Cast Recording.
  The Night They Raided Minsky's Motion Picture Soundtrack recording.
 Follow a Star/Give Me a Night in June
 Happy Ending/The Wisdom of a Fool
 Big in Albania – One Hit Wonderland
 They Didn't Believe Me

Books 
 Lucky Little Devil: Norman Wisdom on the Island He's Made His Home (2004)
 
 Don't Laugh at Me, Cos I'm a Fool (1992) (two volumes of autobiography)
 Trouble in Store (1991)

References

External links 

Pathe News clips of Wisdom from the 1950s
Obituary: Sir Norman Wisdom BBC Retrieved 4 October 2010
Wisdom of Norman
Norman Wisdom Tribute at British Classic Comedy
 Norman Wisdom at BFI Screenonline
 Norman Wisdom a new feature film screenplay about his life and adventures

1915 births
2010 deaths
20th-century English comedians
21st-century English comedians
20th-century English male actors
21st-century English male actors
20th-century English writers
10th Royal Hussars soldiers
Actors awarded knighthoods
BAFTA Most Promising Newcomer to Leading Film Roles winners
British Army personnel of World War II
British male comedy actors
English male comedians
English male film actors
English male musical theatre actors
English male stage actors
English male television actors
English screenwriters
English male screenwriters
English male singer-songwriters
Knights Bachelor
Male actors from Kent
British military musicians
Musicians from Kent
Officers of the Order of the British Empire
People from Deal, Kent
People from Marylebone
Royal Corps of Signals soldiers
Slapstick comedians
Military personnel from London
King's Own Royal Regiment soldiers
British Merchant Navy personnel